Ghan or variation, may refer to:

Places
 Ghan, Northern Territory,  a locality in Australia

 Ghan towns, a name sometimes used for settlements of Afghan cameleers in Australia

People
 Ghans, a name sometimes used for Afghan cameleers in Australia
 Emiliano Ghan (born 1995) Uruguayan soccer player

Fictional characters
 Ghân-buri-Ghân (aka Ghân), a character from J.R.R.Tolkien's The Lord of the Rings

Rail
 The Ghan, an Australian passenger train service
 The Old Ghan, an informal name for the former Central Australia Railway
Old Ghan, a steam train tourist service in Australia - see Pichi Richi Railway
Old Ghan Heritage Railway and Museum, a railway museum in Alice Springs, Central Australia.

See also

 
 
 Gahan
 Gahn
 Afghan (disambiguation)
 Ghani (disambiguation)
 Gan (disambiguation)